Jinxing is a metro station on Line 5 of the Hangzhou Metro in China. It is located in the Yuhang District of Hangzhou and it is the western terminus of Line 5.

References

Railway stations in Zhejiang
Railway stations in China opened in 2020
Hangzhou Metro stations